The Play-offs of the 2017 Fed Cup Americas Zone Group II were the final stages of the Group II Zonal Competition involving teams from the Americas. Using the positions determined in their pools, the thirteen teams faced off to determine their placing in the 2017 Fed Cup Americas Zone Group II. The top two teams advanced to Group I in 2018.

Pool results

Promotional play-offs 
The first placed teams of the four pools were drawn in head-to-head rounds. The winners advanced to Group I.

Ecuador vs. Puerto Rico

Guatemala vs. Peru

Fifth to Eighth place play-offs 
The second placed teams of the four pools were drawn in head-to-head rounds to determine the 5th to 8th placings.

Cuba vs. Trinidad and Tobago

Dominican Republic vs. Costa Rica

Ninth to Twelfth place play-offs 
The third placed teams of the four pools were drawn in head-to-head rounds to determine the 9th to 12th placings.

Uruguay vs. Honduras

Barbados vs. Bahamas

Final placements 

  and  advanced to Americas Zone Group I in 2018.

See also 
 Fed Cup structure

References

External links 
 Fed Cup website

P2